Albizia pistaciifolia is a species of plant in the family Fabaceae. It is found in Colombia, Ecuador, and Venezuela.

Local names include guayacán cenega, guayacán chaparro or guayacán hobo in Colombia, nance or tinto de bajos in Ecuador, and carabali, quiebrahacho or vera macho in Venezuela.

Junior synonyms are:
 Arthrosamanea daulensis (Benth.) Record
 Arthrosamanea pistaciaefolia (Willd.) Britton & Killip
 Cathormion daulense (Benth.) Burkart
 Cathormion pistaciaefolia (Willd.) Burkart
 Feuilleea daulensis (Benth.) Kuntze
 Mimosa pistaciaefolia Willd.
 Pithecellobium daulense Benth.
 Pithecellobium triflorum (G.Don) Benth.
 Pithecolobium triflorum (G.Don) Benth. (orth.var.)
 Samanea guajacifolia Pittier
 Samanea pistaciaefolia (Willd.) Dugand

References

pistacifolia
Least concern plants
Taxonomy articles created by Polbot